NGC 4479 is a barred lenticular galaxy located about 60 million light-years away in the constellation of Coma Berenices. NGC 4479 was discovered by astronomer William Herschel on April 8, 1784. It is a member of the Virgo Cluster.

See also
 List of NGC objects (4001–5000)
 NGC 4477

References

External links

Barred lenticular galaxies
Coma Berenices
4479
41302
7646
Astronomical objects discovered in 1784
Virgo Cluster